Saint-Martin-sous-Montaigu is a commune in the Saône-et-Loire department in the region of Bourgogne-Franche-Comté in eastern France.

Wine
The vineyards of Saint-Martin-sous-Montaigu are part of the appellation d'origine contrôlée Mercurey.

See also
Communes of the Saône-et-Loire department

References

Communes of Saône-et-Loire